Barver is a municipality in the district of Diepholz, Lower Saxony, Germany.

Geography
Barver is located midway between Bremen (54 km to the north-north-east) and Osnabrück (52 km to the south-west), northeast of the Dümmer and Rehden Geest Moor Nature Parks and south of the Wildeshausen Geest Nature Park. The village lies east of the Kellenberg ridge (77 m) and on the west bank of the Wagenfelder Aue, a south-eastern tributary of the Hunte.

History
The first written reference to Barver dates from 1219.

Town twinning
Barver has been twinned with the French commune of Lezay since August 1973.

See also 
 Rehden Geest Moor, a local nature reserve

References

External links
Webseite Samtgemeinde Rehden
Town twinning Barver Lezay

Diepholz (district)